Todd Trainer is the drummer for the band Shellac.  He also performs as a solo artist under the name Brick Layer Cake. He previously played drums for the bands Breaking Circus and Rifle Sport, and he played drums with Scout Niblett in 2005.

Personal life
Trainer resides in Minneapolis, Minnesota and maintains close ties to his parents and sister Terri. His Italian greyhound Uffizi inspired the title of Shellac's fourth studio album Excellent Italian Greyhound. He and his dog, along with his band Shellac, were featured in an episode of  Dogs 101 in 2009 centered on Italian Greyhounds.

Drumming style
Critics generally have favored Trainer's primitive approach to rock drumming. A review in The New York Times of a 2001 Shellac performance described the "stubborn crack and thud of Todd Trainer's drums", and critic Brent DiCrescenzo wrote that "Trainer beats his drums so primally, you'd swear he's only wearing a loincloth." A review in Spin of the Shellac album Terraform declared that Trainer "gracefully resurrects the lost art of the [John] Bonham stomp".

Brick Layer Cake
Brick Layer Cake is the solo project of Todd Trainer, who plays every instrument and sings in a deep, spoken word monotone.  The music of Brick Layer Cake features very slow tempos and "drone-like" compositions, which Steve Albini described as follows: “Think of Nick Drake on downers fronting Black Sabbath, if Black Sabbath played only the good parts of their songs."

Discography
Eye for an Eye - Tooth for a Tooth (Ruthless Records) 1990
Call It A Day (Touch and Go Records) 1991
Tragedy Tragedy (Touch and Go Records) 1994
Whatchamacallit  (Touch and Go Records) 2002

References

External links

Touch and Go Records Artist Page
Myspace Band Page

Year of birth missing (living people)
Living people
American male drummers
American drummers
Musicians from Minnesota
Shellac (band) members
American punk rock drummers